Marko Božič may refer to:
 Marko Božič (Slovenian footballer) (born 1984)
 Marko Božić (Austrian footballer) (born 1998)